Rome High School is a public high school located in Rome, Georgia, United States. It is a part of Rome City School District.

History
The school replaced East Rome High School and West Rome High School. Construction started at the current site, shared with the Rome Middle School, in the summer of 1990. The school opened in 1992.

As part of the National Schools Recognition Program sponsored by the United States Department of Education in an effort to recognize distinguished public schools, the Georgia Department of Education selected this school as a "school of excellence" in 1996. The school was subsequently commended by the Georgia House of Representatives in recognition for being selected as the 1996 Georgia High School of Excellence from the 7th Congressional District.

The school has been named "Best High School in America" three times by U.S. News & World Report (2008, 2009, 2012). The most recent ranking placed Rome High 79 of the 476 high schools in Georgia and 3,441 out of 17,245 high schools nationally.

The school and its students won two Georgia Scholastic Press Awards in 2007, and had two first place prize winners in the 2007 Georgia Humanities Council National History Day state contest.

School demographics 
Rome High is an extremely diverse school with a total minority enrollment of 69%. The diversity of the school is split roughly into thirds with a 33% African-American, a 33% Hispanic, and a 33% Caucasian population respectively.

Academics 
Rome High offers Advanced Placement (AP), Duel Enrollment, and Career Technical and Agricultural Educations (CTAE) classes. The school has an average ACT score of 24, and an average SAT score of 1130.

Rome High School receives Title 1 funding.

Athletics
Rome High sponsors 13 athletic teams on campus, with boys and girls participating in varsity and junior varsity teams. Rome's teams are known as the Wolves, a reference to the she-wolf's role in the myth of the founding of Rome.

Football 
Rome High secured two state titles in 2016 and 2017.

On December 9, 2016, Rome High won the Georgia High School Association 5A Football Championship at the Georgia Dome .

Following their 2016 championship season, they added a 38-0 victory over Warner Robins In 2017 on the Demons home field after the championship weekend In Atlanta was canceled due to weather conditions. The team currently plays at Barron Stadium.

Fine arts

Band
The Rome High Marching Band is known as the "Sound of the Seven Hills." In six competitions between 2006 and 2007, the band was named Grand Champion four times and took third place twice. In the 2011 season, the band was named Grand Champion at the Lake Lanier Competition of Bands. Over the holiday break of 2011, the band traveled to Tampa, Florida to perform at halftime with several other bands at the 2011 Outback Bowl.
They have played in settings including London, England and Rome, Italy with an audience which included Queen Elizabeth II. They have won a GMEA-record 13 Peach State titles as well as the Mid-South Marching Festival championship in 2021.

Chorus
The Rome High Chorus has grown immensely over the past seven years. They have competed and won competitions in Florida, Georgia, and Ohio. They have many extracurriculars, including an a cappella choir which competes in ICHSA, a girls' literary trio that placed first in state in 2010, a boys' quartet that placed first in state in 2008, and a girls' and boys' soloist who have placed first regionally multiple times and have come as close as second place in state.

Drama
The Drama Department at RHS sponsors International Thespian Society Troupe #1722. Every spring the advanced acting class writes a one-act play to perform at the local elementary schools. The department has also produced Beauty and the Beast, Fiddler on the Roof, and Phantom of the Opera.

References

External links
Rome High School
RHS Athletics
RHS Band

Schools in Floyd County, Georgia
Public high schools in Georgia (U.S. state)
Buildings and structures in Rome, Georgia
1992 establishments in Georgia (U.S. state)
Educational institutions established in 1992